Sima Ćirković (Serbian Cyrillic: Сима Ћирковић; 29 January 1929 – 14 November 2009) was a Serbian historian. Ćirković was a member of the Yugoslav Academy of Sciences and Arts and the subsequent Serbian, Bosnian, Montenegrin and Vojvodina offshoots. His works focused on medieval Serbian history.

Life and education 
Sima Ćirković was born on 29 January 1929 in Osijek, Sava Banovina in the Kingdom of Serbs, Croats and Slovenes.

He attended primary school in Sombor, gymnasium in Belgrade during the WWII German Occupation of Serbia (1941 ‒ 1944), and then in Sombor from 1945 to 1948. He began his studies  at the Faculty of Philosophy and History Studies in Belgrade in 1948, graduating in 1952. After a short stint at the State Archives in Zrenjanin and the National Library of Serbia, he was elected as an assistant at the Institute of History in Belgrade in 1955. In 1957, he defended his doctoral dissertation Herceg Stefan Vukčić Kosača i njegovo doba and afterwards became an assistant professor at the University of Belgrade's Faculty of Philosophy for the History of the People of Yugoslavia in the Middle Ages. He became a full professor in 1968, was Vice-Dean from 1964 to 1966 and Dean from 1974 to 1975, and retired in 1994.

Activism and viewpoints
In January 1975, Ćirković resigned from his position as Dean of the Faculty of Philosophy at the University of Belgrade following the planned suspension of the dissident Marxist Humanist Praxis group, all of whom were professors at his faculty.

In 1986 Ćirković criticized the Memorandum of the Serbian Academy of Sciences and Arts, while during the Siege of Dubrovnik in 1991 he and other Yugoslav historians sent an open letter to the Yugoslavian forces asking them to not damage historical district of the city.

He considered the theory of Kosovo Albanians being autochthonous in the territory of Kosovo to be a myth which will be pulverized by critical scientific approach.

Ćirković considered that Bosnia and Herzegovina should not be organised as a national state and that it should be a stable factor in connecting the neighbouring countries.

According to Ćirković, the controversial SANU Memorandum should be considered to be "a so called Memorandum" because it was never adopted by the Academy and he claims that therefore calling the document to be a "memorandum" is a manipulation.

Awards
"Oktobarska Award" (1965)
"Prosveta Award" (1972) 
"Sedmojulska Award" of the Socialist Republic of Serbia for lifetime achievement (1982)
"Orden rada sa crvenom zastavom" (1988) (Order of labor with a red flag)
Belgrade Award (2006)
Konstantin Jirecek" Medal of the German Society for Southeast Europe (2006).

Legacy
In 2006, Croatian historian Ivo Banac mentioned Ćirković as "the most significant living Serbian historian".

Historians John R. Lampe and Constantin Iordachi describe Ćirković as "Serbia's leading medieval historian".

Works 
 Ostaci starije društvene strukture u bosanskom feudalnom društvu, Istorijski glasnik 3-4, Belgrade,1958. 155-164. p.
 Srednjovekovna srpska država-izabrani izvori, Školska knjiga, Zagreb, 1959.
 
 Četvtina, Naučno delo, Belgrade,1963.
 Die bosnische Kirche,Accademia Nazionale dei Lincei,Roma, 1963.
 
 
 
 
 Golubac u srednjem veku, Braničevo, Požarevac, 1968.
 Istorija za II razred gimnazije, Zavod za izdavanje udžbenika, Sarajevo,1967, 1969.
 Đurađ Kastriot Skenderbeg i Bosna, Simpozijum o Skenderbegu, Priština, 1969.
 
 
 O despotu Vuku Grgureviću, Matica srpska, Novi Sad,1970.
 Zdravstvene prilike u srednjovekovnoj bosanskoj državi,Acta historica medicinae, pharmaciae et veterinae 10/2, Sarajevo,1970. 93-98 p.
 Istorija ljudskog društva i kulture od XII do XVIII za učenike II razreda gimnazije društveno-jezičkog smera, Zavod za izdavanje udžbenika Narodne Republike Srbije, Belgrade,1962,1964,1966,1968,1970,1971. (prevedeno na mađarski, rumunski, bugarski i albanski jezik)
 Srednjovekovna Bosna u delu Ante Babić ,"Babić A., Iz istorije srednjovekovne Bosne", Sarajevo,1972. 5-8. p.
 Odjeci ritersko-dvorjanske kulture u Bosni krajem srednjeg veka,"Srednjovekovna Bosna i evropska kultura", Muzej grada, Zenica,1973. 33-40. p.

References

External links 
 Biography of Sima Ćirković on website of Serbian Academy of Science and Arts
 Article about Sima Ćirković in montenegrin language

1929 births
2009 deaths
People from Osijek
Serbs of Croatia
20th-century Serbian historians
Yugoslav historians
21st-century Serbian historians
Serbian medievalists
Members of the Serbian Academy of Sciences and Arts
Members of the Academy of Sciences and Arts of Bosnia and Herzegovina
Members of the Montenegrin Academy of Sciences and Arts